Jaime "Charol" González Ortíz (1 April 1938 – 1985) was a Colombian footballer. He was part of the Colombia national football team at the 1962 FIFA World Cup, which was held in Chile.

References

1938 births
Colombian footballers
Colombia international footballers
1962 FIFA World Cup players
Categoría Primera A players
América de Cali footballers
Millonarios F.C. players
Deportivo Pereira footballers
Deportes Tolima footballers
1985 deaths
Association football defenders